Ticasuk Brown (1904–1982) was an Iñupiaq educator, poet and writer. She was the recipient of a Presidential Commission and was the first Native American to have a school named after her in Fairbanks, Alaska. In 2009, she was placed in the Alaska Women's Hall of Fame.

Early life and work

Emily Ticasuk Ivanoff Brown was born in 1904 in Unalakleet, Alaska. Her name, Ticasuk, means "where the four winds gather their treasures from all parts of the world...the greatest which is knowledge." Her grandfather was Russian, named Sergei Ivanoff, and her grandmother was Yupik, named Chikuk. Brown's parents were Stephen Ivanoff and Malquay. She attended elementary school in Shaktoolik, Alaska, which was a village co-founded by her father. After high school, she became a certified teacher in Oregon. She started teaching in Kotzebue, Alaska. She moved to Washington to study nursing and got married.

The couple moved back to Alaska where Brown started teaching, but her husband died two years into their marriage. She went back to college in 1959, obtaining two Bachelor of Arts at the University of Alaska in Fairbanks. She earned her masters in 1974 with a thesis titled Grandfather of Unalakleet. Her thesis was republished as The Roots of Ticasuk: An Eskimo Woman's Family Story, in 1981. Brown created a curriculum around the Inupiaq language. The foreword to her book, Tales of Ticasuk: Eskimo Legends & Stories, published by the University of Chicago Press, was written by Professor Jimmy Bedford and provides a comprehensive story of her life and contributions.

Later life and legacy

She was given a Presidential Commission by Richard Nixon. She worked at the University of Alaska Fairbanks, where she worked on an Iñupiaq language encyclopedia until she died in 1982 in Fairbanks, Alaska. Just before her death, she was set to receive an honorary doctorate from the University of Alaska Fairbanks.

The learning center at the Northwest Community College in Nome, Alaska is dedicated to her. There is an Emily Ivanoff Ticasuk Brown Award for Human Rights award named after her and which is awarded by the National Education Association of Alaska. Ticasuk Brown Elementary School was the first school in Fairbanks, Alaska to be named after a Native American person. The school opened in September 1987. The name was chosen out of 43 submissions in a quest to name the school. She was placed in the Alaska Women's Hall of Fame in 2009.

References

Further reading
Condor, Jacques. Raven's Children: Word Sketches of the Land and Native Arctic Peoples of Alaska. Bloomington: iUniverse (2003). 
Brown, Emily I. The Roots of Ticasuk: An Eskimo Woman's Family Story. Alaska Northwest Books (1981). 

1904 births
1982 deaths
20th-century American poets
20th-century American educators
20th-century American women writers
American people of Russian descent
Schoolteachers from Alaska
American women poets
Inupiat people
Linguists from the United States
Native American poets
Writers from Fairbanks, Alaska
University of Alaska Fairbanks alumni
American people of Yupik descent
Native American women writers
20th-century American women educators